1866 Williams colonial by-election may refer to 

 1866 Williams colonial by-election 1 held on 22 January 1866
 1866 Williams colonial by-election 2 held on 19 April 1866

See also
 List of New South Wales state by-elections